The 2008 European Mountain Running Championships were held on 12 July in Zell am Harmersbach, Germany. Held by the European Athletic Association, the competition was held on an up- and downhill course in the Black Forest. The championships featured 227 athletes representing 25 nations.

The championships comprised four races: the men's race which was 12 km long with an 804 m ascent and 714 m descent, the women's and under-20s men's competitions over 8.75 km and containing a 566 m ascent and 476 m descent, and finally the under-20s women's race which was competed over 4 km with a rise and fall of 238 m.

Ahmet Arslan defended his title in the men's senior race while Elisa Desco took the gold medal in the women's race. Bernard Dematteis headed home Italy to the senior men's team gold medal and Great Britain won the women's team gold, with bronze medallist Sarah Tunstall the nation's best finisher. The junior men's competition was largely a Turkish affair, with Hasan Pak winning gold and leading a 1-2-3 for his country. The women's junior race was won by Mariya Bykova who, along with Tatyana Prorokova, took the team gold.

Results

Men's senior race

Total participants: 82 runners and 19 teams.

Women's senior race

Total participants: 71 runners and 17 teams.

Men's under-20s race

Total participants: 44 runners and 10 teams.

Women's under-20s race

Total participants: 30 runners and 10 teams.

References

External links
Official website at European Athletics

European Mountain Running Championships
European Mountain Running Championships, 2008
European Mountain Running Championships, 2008
European Mountain Running Championships
International athletics competitions hosted by Germany